Aghcheh Mashhad may refer to:
 Aghcheh Mashhad, Charuymaq
 Aghcheh Mashhad, Malekan
 Aghcheh Mashhad, Maragheh